Kekova, also named Caravola (Greek: Dolichiste), is a small Turkish island near Demre (Demre is the Lycian town of Myra) district of Antalya province which faces the villages of Kaleköy (ancient Simena) and Üçağız (ancient Teimioussa).

Island
After the Italian occupation of Kastelorizo, Kekova — which at that time was temporarily inhabited during summer because of wood harvest — was disputed between Italy and Turkey. The 1932 Convention between Italy and Turkey assigned it to Turkey.

On its northern side there are the partly sunken ruins of Dolchiste/Dolikisthe, an ancient town which was destroyed by an earthquake during the 2nd century.

Rebuilt and still flourishing during the Byzantine Empire period, it was finally abandoned because of Arab incursions.

The Tersane (meaning "dockyard", as its bay was the site of an ancient city Xera and dockyard, with the ruins of a Byzantine church) is at the northwest of the island.

The Kekova region was declared a specially protected area on 18 January 1990 by the Turkish Ministry of Environment and Forest. All kinds of diving and swimming were prohibited and were subjected to special permits from governmental offices. In later years the prohibition has been lifted, except for the part where the sunken city is located.

Kaleköy (locally just "Kale") (ancient Simena) is a Lycian site on the Turkish coast. It is a small village with the partly sunken ruins of Aperlae and a castle.  ccess to the village is possible only by sea.

Üçağız (ancient name, Teimioussa) is a village one km from Kaleköy, north of a small bay by the same name, with the ruins of Teimioussa to the east.  The name "Üçağız" means "three mouths", referring to the three exits to open sea.

Notes

Sources

External links
 

Islands of Turkey
Antalya
Turkish Riviera
World Heritage Tentative List for Turkey
Islands of Antalya Province
Demre District